A word board or communications board is a simple means to help people who have lost the ability to speak.  A word board may typically be provided to those recovering after a stroke.
To communicate, the user points at the relevant words, letters or symbols on the board. Typically the following are included:

Yes |No |  (☺) | 
|Want| That

ABCD    EFG

HIJK    LMNOP

QRS	X    TUV

& WX     ?      YZ

Why|What|When|Where	

There are now sophisticated electronic speech synthesis devices available for this purpose.

References

Assistive technology